Amphibious is a 2010 thriller film directed by Brian Yuzna and written by Yuzna, John Penney, Somtow Sucharitkul and San Fu Maltha. It stars Francis Magee, Janna Fassaert and Michael Paré.

Plot
Skyler Shane, a marine biologist, meets Jack Bowman, at a northern Sumatran lake to search for prehistoric samples. During this expedition, they encounter some smugglers who have their headquarters on the lake. Tamal, an orphan who was sold to the smugglers as a slave, begs Skyler to save her. Since the child reminds Skyler of her lost daughter Rebecca, she agrees, not knowing what secret is lurking in the water. Ever since Tamal has been on the lake, strange things have been happening: more and more people disappear and are devoured by a creature from the deep.

Cast
 Monica Sayangbati as Tamal
 Janna Fassaert as Skylar Shane
 Michael Paré as Jack Bowman
 Dorman Borisman as Bimo
 Francis Bosco as Boss Harris
 Francis Magee as Jimmy Kudrow
 Verdi Solaiman as Andi
 Mohammad Aditya as Big Rudi
 Ronald Reagen as Rizal
 Herlian Ujang as Nanung
 Mikael C. Jehian as Aris
 Bambang Budi Santoso as Dukun
 Ida Jessica Peter as Rebekka "Bekka" Shane
 Joshua Pandelaki as Santoso
 Timo Ottevanger as Logan
 Elke Salverda as Julie

Production
This was Yuzna's first film as director since the 2005 film Beneath Still Waters. The film was also the first Dutch 3D production and was filmed in summer 2009 at various locations in Indonesia.

Release
The theatrical release date for the film in the Netherlands was 1 November 2010.

References

External links

Giant monster films
2010 films
Dutch horror thriller films
2010s English-language films
English-language Dutch films
English-language Indonesian films
Films shot in Indonesia
Indonesian horror thriller films
2010s monster movies
Natural horror films
Fiction by S. P. Somtow